Robert Manzenreiter (born August 28, 1966 in Innsbruck) is an Austrian luger who competed during the late 1980s and early 1990s. He won two silver medals in the mixed team event at the FIL World Luge Championships (1991, 1993).

Manzenreiter also finished sixth in the men's singles event at the 1992 Winter Olympics in Albertville. , he is training coordinator for the Austria luge team.

References

External links
1992 luge men's singles results
2007 World Cup news from Königssee, Germany which included Manzenreiter 
Hickok sports information on World champions in luge and skeleton.

1966 births
Austrian male lugers
Olympic lugers of Austria
Living people
Lugers at the 1988 Winter Olympics
Lugers at the 1992 Winter Olympics